Globecom Tower was a  tall guyed mast for military longwave transmission at Northmountain on Thule Air Base on Greenland. Globecom Tower, whose design is similar to that of Forestport Tower, is a guyed lattice steel tower with a triangular cross section (sidelength: 4.75 metres), which is anchored in three levels.

Globecom Tower was completed in 1954.  It was, at completion, the tallest man-made structure outside of the United States and the third tallest in the world after KWTV Mast in Oklahoma City and Empire State Building.  A great difficulty at its construction was that the ground on which it was built is permanently frozen.

Globecom Tower was used for transmitting military telex messages to CFB Goose Bay, Canada, on the longwave frequency 68.9 kHz with a power of 50 kW under the callsign XPH.

The tower, unused for years, was brought down with explosive charges set and detonated by US Army combat engineers in the spring of 1992.

Literature
 Turmbauwerke, Bauverlag GmbH, Wiesbaden (Deutschland), Germany, 1966 (there mentioned as "Funkmast in der Arktis")

External links
 https://web.archive.org/web/20080313111152/http://www.thuleforum.com/north_mountain.htm
 http://www.skyscraperpage.com/diagrams/?b870

Military radio systems of the United States
Radio masts and towers
Equipment of the United States Air Force
Towers in Greenland
Installations of the United States Air Force in Greenland
1954 establishments in Greenland
Towers completed in 1954
1992 disestablishments in Greenland
Buildings and structures demolished in 1992

sv:Globecom Tower